is a Japanese football player who plays for Kyoto Sanga FC.

Club statistics

Personal honours
J.League Best Eleven - 2010

Club
Nagoya Grampus
J1 League - 2010
Japanese Super Cup - 2011

Hokkaido Consadole Sapporo
J2 League - 2016

References

External links

Profile at Hokkaido Consadole Sapporo
Profile at Kyoto Sanga FC

1979 births
Living people
Osaka University of Commerce alumni
Association football people from Hyōgo Prefecture
Japanese footballers
J1 League players
J2 League players
Avispa Fukuoka players
Nagoya Grampus players
Vissel Kobe players
Hokkaido Consadole Sapporo players
Kyoto Sanga FC players
Association football defenders